Winslow Burke Fegley (born January 23, 2009) is an American child actor. He has starred in the films Timmy Failure: Mistakes Were Made (2020), Nightbooks, 8-Bit Christmas (both 2021), and Lyle, Lyle, Crocodile (2022).

Life and career 
Fegley was born on January 23, 2009, in Allentown, Pennsylvania, the son of Michael Fegley and Mercedes Fegley (née Tonne). He is the younger brother of Oakes Fegley, also an actor.

Fegley starred in the hit HBO movie 8-Bit Christmas, with the lead role as Young Jake, and Disney's comedy film, Timmy Failure: Mistakes Were Made as the same title of the character.

He also stars in the 2022 live-action/animated film Lyle, Lyle, Crocodile.

Filmography

Film

Television

References

External links

2009 births
Living people
21st-century American male actors
American male child actors
American male film actors
American male television actors
Male actors from Allentown, Pennsylvania